Ivanovsky is a rural locality (a khutor) in Panfilovskoye Rural Settlement, Novoanninsky District, Volgograd Oblast, Russia. The population was 85 as of 2010.

Geography 
The village is located in forest steppe on the Khopyorsko-Buzulukskaya Plain.

References 

Rural localities in Novoanninsky District